Statistics of Japan Soccer League for the 1983 season.

First Division
Yomiuri, the football club became one of big names of earlier years of J.League as Verdy Kawasaki, and currently known as Tokyo Verdy, won its first of seven League championships, fully riding in the wave of its parent company's funds and prestige.

Mazda, five-time First Division champions in the 1960s, was relegated for the first time. Hitachi saved itself by defeating Sumitomo in the playout.

Promotion/relegation Series

Second Division
NKK returned to the top flight at the first time of asking.

Saitama Teachers went back to the Kantō regional league, and Toho Titanium followed when they lost the playout to Matsushita, a rising club at the time based in Nara which would eventually become Gamba Osaka.

Promotion/relegation Series

References
Japan - List of final tables (RSSSF)

Japan Soccer League seasons
1
Jap
Jap